The 1900 Ohio Green and White football team was an American football team that represented Ohio University as an independent during the 1900 college football season. Led by Karl Core in his first and only season as head coach, the team compiled a record of 2–4–1. Five of their seven games were shutouts.

Schedule

References

Ohio
Ohio Bobcats football seasons
Ohio Green and White football